Falcon Heavy is a partially reusable Super heavy-lift launch vehicle produced by SpaceX, an American aerospace manufacturer. The rocket consists of a center core on which two Falcon 9 boosters are attached, and a second stage on top of the center core.  Falcon Heavy has the second highest payload capacity of any currently operational launch vehicle behind NASA's Space Launch System, and the fourth-highest capacity of any rocket to reach orbit, trailing behind SLS, Energia and the Saturn V.

SpaceX conducted Falcon Heavy's maiden launch on 6 February 2018, at 20:45 UTC. As a dummy payload, the rocket carried a Tesla Roadster belonging to SpaceX founder Elon Musk, with a mannequin dubbed "Starman" in the driver's seat. The second Falcon Heavy launch occurred on 11 April 2019, and all three booster rockets successfully returned to Earth. The third Falcon Heavy launch successfully occurred on 25 June 2019. Since then, Falcon Heavy has been certified for the National Security Space Launch (NSSL) program.

Falcon Heavy was designed to be able to carry humans into space beyond low Earth orbit, although , SpaceX does not intend to transport people on Falcon Heavy, nor pursue the human-rating certification process to transport NASA astronauts. Both Falcon Heavy and Falcon 9 are expected to eventually be superseded by the in-development Starship launch system.

History 

Concepts for a Falcon Heavy launch vehicle using three Falcon 1 core boosters, with an approximate payload-to-LEO capacity of two tons, were initially discussed as early as 2003. The concept for three core booster stages of the company's as-yet-unflown Falcon 9 was referred to in 2005 as the Falcon 9 Heavy.

SpaceX unveiled the plan for the Falcon Heavy to the public at a Washington, D.C. news conference in April 2011, with initial test flight expected in 2013.

A number of factors delayed the planned maiden flight by five years to 2018, including two anomalies with Falcon 9 launch vehicles, which required all engineering resources to be dedicated to failure analysis, halting flight operations for many months. The integration and structural challenges of combining three Falcon 9 cores were much more difficult than expected.

In July 2017, Elon Musk said, "It actually ended up being way harder to do Falcon Heavy than we thought. ... We were pretty naive about that".

The initial test flight for a Falcon Heavy lifted off on 6 February 2018, at 20:45 UTC, carrying its dummy payload, Elon Musk's personal Tesla Roadster, beyond Mars orbit.

Conception and funding 
Musk mentioned Falcon Heavy in a September 2005 news update, referring to a customer request from 18 months prior. Various solutions using the planned Falcon 5 (which was never flown) had been explored, but the only cost-effective, reliable iteration was one that used a 9-engine first stage — the Falcon 9. The Falcon Heavy was developed with private capital with Musk stating that the cost was more than US$500 million. No government financing was provided for its development.

Design and development 

The Falcon Heavy design is based on Falcon 9's fuselage and engines. By 2008, SpaceX had been aiming for the first launch of Falcon 9 in 2009, while "Falcon 9 Heavy would be in a couple of years". Speaking at the 2008 Mars Society Conference, Musk also indicated that he expected a hydrogen-fueled upper stage would follow two to three years later (which would have been around 2013).

By April 2011, the capabilities and performance of the Falcon 9 vehicle were better understood, SpaceX having completed two successful demonstration missions to low Earth orbit (LEO), one of which included reignition of the second-stage engine. At a press conference at the National Press Club in Washington, D.C. on 5 April 2011, Musk stated that Falcon Heavy would "carry more payload to orbit or escape velocity than any vehicle in history, apart from the Saturn V Moon rocket ... and Soviet Energia rocket". In the same year, with the expected increase in demand for both variants, SpaceX announced plans to expand manufacturing capacity "as we build towards the capability of producing a Falcon 9 first stage or Falcon Heavy side booster every week and an upper stage every two weeks".

In 2015, SpaceX announced a number of changes to the Falcon Heavy rocket, worked in parallel to the upgrade of the Falcon 9 v1.1 launch vehicle. In December 2016, SpaceX released a photo showing the Falcon Heavy interstage at the company headquarters in Hawthorne, California.

Testing 
By May 2013, a new, partly underground test stand was being built at the SpaceX Rocket Development and Test Facility in McGregor, Texas, specifically to test the triple cores and twenty-seven rocket engines of the Falcon Heavy. By May 2017, SpaceX conducted the first static fire test of flight-design Falcon Heavy center core at the McGregor facility.

In July 2017, Musk discussed publicly the challenges of testing a complex launch vehicle like the three-core Falcon Heavy, indicating that a large extent of the new design "is really impossible to test on the ground" and could not be effectively tested independent of actual flight tests.

By September 2017, all three first stage cores had completed their static fire tests on the ground test stand. The first Falcon Heavy static fire test was conducted on 24 January 2018.

Maiden flight 

In April 2011, Musk was planning for a first launch of Falcon Heavy from Vandenberg Air Force Base on the West Coast in 2013. SpaceX refurbished Launch Complex 4E at Vandenberg AFB to accommodate Falcon 9 and Heavy. The first launch from the Cape Canaveral East Coast launch complex was planned for late 2013 or 2014.

Due partly to the failure of SpaceX CRS-7 in June 2015, SpaceX rescheduled the maiden Falcon Heavy flight in September 2015 to occur no earlier than April 2016. The flight was to be launched from the refurbished Kennedy Space Center Launch Complex 39A. The flight was postponed again to late 2016, early 2017, summer 2017, late 2017 and finally to February 2018.

At a July 2017 meeting of the International Space Station Research and Development meeting in Washington, D.C., Musk downplayed expectations for the success of the maiden flight:
There's a real good chance the vehicle won't make it to orbit ... I hope it makes it far enough away from the pad that it does not cause pad damage. I would consider even that a win, to be honest.

In December 2017, Musk tweeted that the dummy payload on the maiden Falcon Heavy launch would be his personal Tesla Roadster playing David Bowie's "Life on Mars", and that it would be launched into an orbit around the Sun that will reach the orbit of Mars. He released pictures in the following days. The car had three cameras attached to provide "epic views".

On December 28, 2017, the Falcon Heavy was moved to the launch pad in preparation of a static fire test of all 27 engines, which was expected on 19 January 2018. However, due to the U.S. government shutdown that began on 20 January 2018, the testing and launch were further delayed. The static fire test was conducted on 24 January 2018. Musk confirmed via Twitter that the test "was good" and later announced the rocket would be launched on 6 February 2018.

On 6 February 2018, after a delay of over two hours due to high winds, Falcon Heavy lifted off at 20:45 UTC. Its side boosters landed safely on Landing Zones 1 and 2 a few minutes later.

Initially, Elon Musk tweeted that the Roadster had overshot its planned heliocentric orbit, and would reach the asteroid belt. Later, observations by telescopes showed that the Roadster would only slightly exceed the orbit of Mars at aphelion.

Later flights 
A year after the successful demo flight, SpaceX had signed five commercial contracts worth US$500–750 million, meaning that it had managed to cover the development cost of the rocket. The second flight, and first commercial one, occurred on 11 April 2019, launching Arabsat-6A, with all three boosters landing successfully for the first time.

The third flight occurred on 25 June 2019, launching the STP-2 (DoD Space Test Program) payload. The payload was composed of 25 small spacecraft. Operational Geostationary transfer orbit (GTO) missions for Intelsat and Inmarsat, which were planned for late 2017, were moved to the Falcon 9 Full Thrust rocket version as it had become powerful enough to lift those heavy payloads in its expendable configuration. In June 2022, the U.S. Space Force certified Falcon Heavy for launching its top secret satellites, with the first such launch being USSF-44 which happened at 1 November 2022; it successfully launched on 1 November 2022. and the second of which being USSF-67,which was launched 11 weeks after USSF-44.

Following the announcement of NASA's Artemis program of returning humans to the Moon, the Falcon Heavy rocket has been mentioned several times as an alternative to the expensive Space Launch System (SLS) program, but NASA decided to exclusively use SLS to launch the Orion capsule. However, Falcon Heavy will support commercial missions for the Artemis program, since it will be used to transport the Dragon XL spacecraft to the Gateway. It was also selected to launch the first two elements of the Lunar Gateway, the Power and Propulsion Element (PPE), and the Habitation and Logistics Outpost (HALO), on a single launch in November 2024.

Design 

Falcon Heavy consists of a structurally strengthened Falcon 9 as the "core" component, with two additional Falcon 9 first stages with aerodynamic nose–cones mounted outboard serving as strap-on boosters, conceptually similar to Delta IV Heavy launcher and proposals for the Atlas V Heavy and Russian Angara A5V. This triple first stage carries a standard Falcon 9 second stage, which in turn carries the payload in a fairing. The rocket was designed to meet or exceed all current requirements of human rating. The structural safety margins are 40% above flight loads, higher than the 25% margins of other rockets. Falcon Heavy was designed from the outset to carry humans into space and it would restore the possibility of flying crewed missions to the Moon or Mars.

The first stage is powered by three Falcon 9 derived cores, each equipped with nine Merlin 1D engines. At launch, the center core throttles to full power for a few seconds for additional thrust, then throttles down. This allows a longer burn time. After the side boosters separate, the center core throttles back up to maximum thrust. For added reliability of restart, the engine has dual redundant pyrophoric igniters (Triethylaluminium-Triethylborane) (TEA-TEB). The interstage, which connects the upper and lower stage for Falcon 9, is a carbon fiber aluminum core composite structure. Stage separation occurs via reusable separation collets and a pneumatic pusher system. The Falcon 9 tank walls and domes are made from Aluminium–lithium alloy. SpaceX uses an all-friction stir welded tank. The second stage tank of Falcon 9 is simply a shorter version of the first stage tank and uses most of the same tooling, material, and manufacturing techniques. This approach reduces manufacturing costs during vehicle production.

All three cores of the Falcon Heavy arrange the engines in a structural form SpaceX calls Octaweb, aimed at streamlining the manufacturing process, and each core includes four extensible landing legs. To control the descent of the boosters and center core through the atmosphere, SpaceX uses four retractable grid fins at the top of each of the three Falcon 9 boosters, which extend after separation. Immediately after the side boosters separate, the center engine in each burns for a few seconds in order to control the booster's trajectory safely away from the rocket. The grid fins then deploy as the boosters turn back to Earth, followed by the landing legs. Each booster lands softly on the ground in fully reusable launch configuration. The two side boosters land on different drone ships in partial reusable configuration. The center core continues to fire until stage separation. In fully reusable launches, its grid fins and legs deploy and the center core touches down either back on land or on a drone ship. If the stages are expended, then the landing legs and grid fins are omitted from the vehicle. The landing legs are made of carbon fiber with aluminum honeycomb structure. The four legs stow along the sides of each core during liftoff and extend outward and down just before landing.

Rocket specifications 

The Falcon Heavy uses a  interstage attached to the first stage core. It is a composite structure consisting of an aluminum honeycomb core surrounded by a carbon fiber face sheet plies. Unlike for Falcon 9, the black thermal protection layer on the interstage of Block 5 center core boosters is later painted white, as seen in the Falcon Heavy flights so far, probably due to asthetics of Falcon Heavy Logo, providing it a greyish look.

The Falcon Heavy includes first-stage recovery systems, to allow SpaceX to return the first stage boosters to the launch site as well as recover the first stage core following landing at an Autonomous Spaceport Drone Ship barge after completion of primary mission requirements. These systems include four deployable landing legs, which are locked against each first-stage tank core during ascent and deploy just prior to touchdown. Excess propellant reserved for Falcon Heavy first-stage recovery operations will be diverted for use on the primary mission objective, if required, ensuring sufficient performance margins for successful missions. The Falcon Heavy can also inject a  payload into GTO if only the two side boosters are recovered.

Capabilities 

The partially reusable Falcon Heavy falls into the heavy-lift range of launch systems, capable of lifting  into low Earth orbit (LEO), under the classification system used by a NASA human spaceflight review panel.

The maximum payload is achieved when the rocket flies a fully expendable launch profile, not recovering any of the three first-stage boosters. Returning all three boosters to the launch site rather than landing them on drone ships would yield about 30 t of payload to LEO.

Reusability 

From 2013 to 2016, SpaceX conducted parallel development of a reusable rocket architecture for Falcon 9, that applies to parts of Falcon Heavy as well. Early on, SpaceX had expressed hopes that all rocket stages would eventually be reusable. SpaceX has since demonstrated routine land and sea recovery of the Falcon 9 first stage, and have successfully recovered multiple payload fairings. In the case of Falcon Heavy, the two outer cores separate from the rocket earlier in the flight, and are thus moving at a lower velocity than in a Falcon 9 launch profile. For the first flight of Falcon Heavy, SpaceX had considered attempting to recover the second stage, but did not execute this plan.

Falcon Heavy payload performance to geosynchronous transfer orbit (GTO) is reduced by the reusable technology, but at a much lower price. As a comparison, the next-heaviest contemporary rocket, the fully expendable Delta IV Heavy, can deliver  to GTO.

Propellant crossfeed 
Falcon Heavy was originally designed with a unique "propellant crossfeed" capability, whereby the center core engines would be supplied with fuel and oxidizer from the two side cores until their separation. Operating all engines at full thrust from launch, with fuel supplied mainly from the side boosters, would deplete the side boosters sooner, allowing their earlier separation to reduce the mass being accelerated. This would leave most of the center core propellant available after booster separation.

Musk stated in 2016 that crossfeed would not be implemented. Instead, the center booster throttles down shortly after liftoff to conserve fuel, and resumes full thrust after the side boosters have separated.

Environmental impact 
BBC Science Focus, in February 2018, published an article on Falcon Heavy's environmental impact. It stated concerns that frequent Falcon Heavy launches can contribute to pollution in the atmosphere.

The Planetary Society was concerned that launching a non-sterile object (as was done on the Falcon Heavy Test Flight) to interplanetary space may risk biological contamination of a foreign world. Scientists at Purdue University thought it was the "dirtiest" man-made object ever sent into space, in terms of bacteria amount, noting the car was previously driven on Los Angeles freeways. Although the vehicle will be sterilized by solar radiation over time, some bacteria might survive on pieces of plastic which could contaminate Mars in the distant future.

A study conducted by the Federal Aviation Administration found that the boost-back and landing of Falcon Heavy boosters "would not significantly affect the quality of the human environment".

Launch prices 
At an appearance in May 2004 before the United States Senate Committee on Commerce, Science, and Transportation, Musk testified, "Long term plans call for development of a heavy lift product and even a super-heavy, if there is customer demand. We expect that each size increase would result in a meaningful decrease in cost per pound to orbit. ... Ultimately, I believe US$500 per pound or less is very achievable". This  goal stated by Musk in 2011 is 35% of the cost of the lowest-cost-per-pound LEO-capable launch system in a 2001 study: the Zenit, a medium-lift launch vehicle that could carry  into LEO for US$35–50 million. In 2011, SpaceX stated that the cost of reaching low Earth orbit could be as low as  if an annual rate of four launches can be sustained, and as of 2011 planned to eventually launch as many as 10 Falcon Heavies and 10 Falcon 9s annually.

This equates to a price of US$2,350 per kg to LEO and US$5,620 per kg to GTO. In 2022, the published price for a reusable launch was $97 million; however in 2022 NASA contracted with SpaceX to launch the Nancy Grace Roman Space Telescope on a Falcon Heavy for approximately $255 million, including launch service and other mission related costs.

The nearest competing U.S. rocket is ULA's Delta IV Heavy with a LEO payload capacity of  costs US$12,340 per kg to LEO and US$24,630 per kg to GTO.  The Delta IV Heavy will be retired in 2024 with 2 flights remaining .

Competitors from 2023 onwards may include SpaceX Starship (100+ t to LEO), Blue Origin's New Glenn (45 t to LEO), Indian Space Research Organisation (ISRO) SHLV (41.3 t to LEO) and United Launch Alliance (ULA) Vulcan Centaur (27 t to LEO).

Launches and payloads 

Due to improvements to the performance of Falcon 9, some of the heavier satellites flown to GTO, such as Intelsat 35e and Inmarsat-5 F4, ended up being launched before the debut of Falcon Heavy. SpaceX anticipated the first commercial Falcon Heavy launch would be three to six months after a successful maiden flight, but due to delays the first commercial payload, Arabsat-6A was successfully launched on 11 April 2019, a year and two months after the first flight. SpaceX hoped to have 10 launches every year from 2021 on, but there were no launches in 2020 or 2021.

First commercial contracts 
In May 2012, SpaceX announced that Intelsat had signed the first commercial contract for a Falcon Heavy flight. It was not confirmed at the time when the first Intelsat launch would occur, but the agreement will have SpaceX delivering satellites to geosynchronous transfer orbit (GTO). In August 2016, it emerged that this Intelsat contract had been reassigned to a Falcon 9 Full Thrust mission to deliver Intelsat 35e into orbit in the third quarter of 2017. Performance improvements of the Falcon 9 vehicle family since the 2012 announcement, advertising  to GTO for its expendable flight profile, enable the launch of this 6 t satellite without upgrading to a Falcon Heavy variant.

In 2014, Inmarsat booked three launches with Falcon Heavy, but due to delays they switched a payload to Ariane 5 for 2017. Similarly to the Intelsat 35e case, another satellite from this contract, Inmarsat 5-F4, was switched to a Falcon 9 Full Thrust thanks to the increased liftoff capacity. The remaining contract covers the launch of Inmarsat-6 F1 in 2020 on a Falcon 9.

Department of Defense contracts 
In December 2012, SpaceX announced its first Falcon Heavy launch contract with the United States Department of Defense (DoD).

In April 2015, SpaceX sent the U.S. Air Force an updated letter of intent outlining a certification process for its Falcon Heavy rocket to launch national security satellites. The process includes three successful flights of the Falcon Heavy including two consecutive successful flights, and the letter stated that Falcon Heavy can be ready to fly national security payloads by 2017. But in July 2017, SpaceX announced that the first test flight would take place in December 2017, pushing the launch of the second launch (Space Test Program 2) to June 2018. In May 2018, on the occasion of the first launch of the Falcon 9 Block 5 variant, a further delay to October 2018 was announced, and the launch was eventually pushed back to 25 June 2019. The STP-2 mission used three Block 5 cores.

SpaceX was awarded 40% of the launches in Phase 2 of the National Security Space Launch (NSSL) contracts, which includes several launches and a vertical integration facility and development of a larger fairing, from 2024 to 2027.

Space Test Program 2 (STP-2) mission 
The payload for the STP-2 mission of the Department of Defense included 25 small spacecraft from the U.S. military, NASA, and research institutions:

The Green Propellant Infusion Mission (GPIM) was a payload; it is a project partly developed by the U.S. Air Force to demonstrate a less-toxic propellant.

Another secondary payload is the miniaturized Deep Space Atomic Clock that is expected to facilitate autonomous navigation. The British 'Orbital Test Bed' payload is hosting several commercial and military experiments.

Other small satellites included Prox 1, built by Georgia Tech students to test out a 3D-printed thruster and a miniaturized gyroscope, LightSail by The Planetary Society, Oculus-ASR nanosatellite from Michigan Tech, and CubeSats from the U.S. Air Force Academy, the Naval Postgraduate School, the United States Naval Research Laboratory, the University of Texas at Austin, California Polytechnic State University, and a CubeSat assembled by students at Merritt Island High School in Florida.

The Block 5-second stage allowed multiple reignitions to place its many payloads in multiple orbits. The launch was planned to include a  ballast mass, but the ballast mass was later omitted from the  total mass for the payload stack.

NASA contracts

Solar System transport missions
In 2011, NASA Ames Research Center proposed a Mars mission called Red Dragon that would use a Falcon Heavy as the launch vehicle and trans-Martian injection vehicle, and a variant of the Dragon capsule to enter the Martian atmosphere. The proposed science objectives were to detect biosignatures and to drill  or so underground, in an effort to sample reservoirs of water ice known to exist under the surface. The mission cost  was projected to be less than US$425 million, not including the launch cost. Beyond the Red Dragon concept, SpaceX was seeing potential for Falcon Heavy and Dragon 2 to carry science payloads across much of the Solar System, particularly to Jupiter's moon Europa. SpaceX announced in 2017 that propulsive landing for Dragon 2 would not be developed further, and that the capsule would not receive landing legs. Consequently, the Red Dragon missions to Mars were canceled in favor of Starship, a larger vehicle using a different landing technology.

Lunar missions 
Falcon Heavy is the launch vehicle for the initial modules of the Lunar Gateway: Power and Propulsion Element (PPE) and Habitation and Logistics Outpost (HALO). To decrease complexity NASA announced in February 2021 that it is launching the first two elements on a single Falcon Heavy launch vehicle, targeting a launch date no earlier than November 2024. Before switching to a merged launch, NASA listed in April 2020 Falcon Heavy as the launch vehicle for PPE lone launch.

In March 2020, Falcon Heavy won the first award to a resupply mission to the Gateway, placing a new Dragon XL spacecraft on a translunar injection orbit.

Psyche and Europa Clipper 
NASA has chosen Falcon Heavy as the launch vehicle for its Psyche mission to a metallic asteroid with a planned launch in October 2023. The contract is worth US$117 million.

Europa Clipper was initially targeted to be launched on an SLS rocket.  However, due to extensive delays, in 2021 NASA awarded the launch contract to SpaceX for a fully expendable Falcon Heavy.

See also 

 Comparison of orbital launch systems
 Comparison of orbital launchers families
 SpaceX Mars transportation infrastructure 
 Saturn C-3
 Delta IV Heavy

Notes

References

External links 
 Falcon Heavy official page
 Falcon Heavy flight animation, February 2018
 Elon Musk on how Falcon Heavy will change space travel, The Verge YouTube

 
SpaceX launch vehicles
Partially reusable space launch vehicles
Vehicles introduced in 2018